| tries = {{#expr:

 + 1 +  6 + 7 + 6 + 6  +  7 + 1 + 4 + 4 +  9
 + 6 + 10 + 6 + 6 + 6  + 10 + 5 + 3 + 3 +  5
 + 2 + 11 + 2 + 3 + 9  +  9 + 8 + 7 + 9 +  6
 + 5 +  6 + 4 + 7 + 3  + 10 + 3 + 4 + 4 + 13
 + 4 +  3 + 6 + 4 + 8  +  8 + 3 + 3 + 4 +  5
 + 9 +  6 + 6 + 3 + 12 +  5 + 5 + 2 + 7 +  5
 + 3 +  0 + 0 + 0
 + 0 +  0
   + 0
}}
| top point scorer = Benoît Paillaugue (Montpellier)Rhys Patchell (Cardiff Blues)(56 points)
| top try scorer = Marcus Watson (Newcastle Falcons)(6 tries)
| venue               = Grand Stade de Lyon, Lyon
| attendance2         = 
| champions           =  Montpellier
| count               = 1
| runner-up           =  Harlequins
| website             = EPCR Website
| previous year       = 2014–15
| previous tournament = 2014–15 European Rugby Challenge Cup
| next year           = 2016–17
| next tournament     = 2016–17 European Rugby Challenge Cup
}}

The 2015–16 European Rugby Challenge Cup was the second edition of the European Rugby Challenge Cup, an annual pan-European rugby union competition for professional clubs. It is also the 20th season of the Challenge Cup competition in all forms, following on from the now defunct European Challenge Cup. Due to the 2015 Rugby World Cup taking place during September and October 2015, the competition began slightly later than usual, with the first round of the group stage, on the weekend of 12/13/14/15 November 2015, and ended with the final on 13 May 2016 in Lyon.

Gloucester were the 2014 1–5 champions, having beaten Edinburgh 19–13 in the final.

Montpellier won the cup, defeating Harlequins in the final 26–19.

Teams
20 teams qualified for the 2015–16 European Rugby Challenge Cup; a total of 18 qualified from across the Premiership, Pro12 and Top 14, as a direct result of their domestic league performance, with two coming through a play-off. The distribution of teams was:
 England: 6
 Any teams, excluding the 2014–15 European Rugby Challenge Cup winner, finishing between 7th-11th position in the Aviva Premiership. (4 Teams)
 The champion of the 2014–15 Greene King IPA Championship. (1 Team)
 There was a sixth club from England, after Gloucester lost the play-off series for entry into the European Rugby Champions Cup. (1 club)
 France: 7
 Any teams finishing between 8th-12th position in the Top 14. (5 Teams)
 The champion, and the winner of the promotion play-off, from the Pro D2. (2 Teams)
 Ireland, Italy, Scotland & Wales: 5 teams
 Any teams that did not qualify for the European Rugby Champions Cup, or the play-off, through the Guinness Pro12. (4 teams)
 There was a 5th team from Pro12, after Connacht were defeated by Gloucester in the first round of the Champions Cup play-off. (1 team)
 Other European Nations: 2 teams
 Two teams qualified through the 2014–15 Qualifying Competition, which took place alongside the Challenge Cup and Champions Cup competitions.

As of 24 May 2015, the following clubs qualified for the Challenge Cup:

Champions Cup play-off

The following teams took part in play-off matches to decide the final team in the Champions Cup. The play-off was held between Premiership side Gloucester, as Challenge Cup winners, and teams from the Pro12 and Top 14.

The play-off was a two-match series, with the winner of the first match progressing to the second, and the winner of that second match qualifying for the Champions Cup. The two losing sides both joined the Challenge Cup.

Qualifying Competition

In December 2014, EPCR announced an expanded format for the qualifying competition.

Six teams were to compete in two pools of three. Each team played the other once, either home or away. The winner of each pool then played a two-legged final against last year's qualifying sides, and the winners, on aggregate, took the two remaining places in the Challenge Cup.

Pool 1 play-off

 Calvisano won the play-off 52–24 on aggregate, and qualified for the Challenge Cup.

Pool 2 play-off

 Enisey-STM won the play-off 63–32 on aggregate, and competed in the Challenge Cup

Team details
Below is the list of coaches, captain and stadiums with their method of qualification for each team.

Note: Placing shown in brackets, denotes standing at the end of the regular season for their respective leagues, with their end of season positioning shown through CH for Champions, RU for Runner-up, SF for losing Semi-finalist and QF for losing Quarter-finalist.

Seeding
The 20 competing teams were seeded and split into four tiers; seeding was based on performance in their respective domestic leagues. Where promotion and relegation is in effect in a league, the promoted team was seeded last, or (if multiple teams are promoted) by performance in the lower tier. So, Pau – who were Pro D2 champions – will be seeded above Agen – who qualified through the Pro D2 play-off.

Teams were taken from a league in order of rank and put into a tier. A draw was used to allocate two second seeds to Tier 1; the remaining team went into Tier 2. This allocation indirectly determined which fourth-seeded team entered Tier 2, while the others entered Tier 3.

Given the nature of the Qualifying Competition, a competition including developing rugby nations and Italian clubs not competing in the Pro12, Rugby Europe 1 and Rugby Europe 2 were automatically included in Tier 4, despite officially being ranked 1/2 from that competition.

The brackets show each team's seeding and their league (for example, 1 Top 14 indicates the team was seeded 1st from the Top 14).

The draw for the Challenge Cup took place on 17 June 2015 in Neuchatel, Switzerland.

The following restrictions applied to the draw:
 The 5 pools each consisted of four clubs, one from each of the 4 Tiers.
 Each pool was required to have one Aviva Premiership club from Tier 1, 2 or 3, one Top 14 club from Tier 1, 2 or 3, and one Pro12 club from Tier 1, 2 or 3 (with the possibility of a second Aviva or Top 14 or Pro12 club coming from Tier 4). 
 If there were two PRO12 clubs in the same pool, they had to be from different countries. (There were 2 Welsh, 1 Irish, 1 Scottish and 1 Italian teams from the Pro12 this year.) 
 Similarly, the two Italian sides (Tier 3 Zebre from the Pro12 and Tier 4 Calvisano from the Qualifying Competition) could not be in the same pool.

Pool stage

The draw took place on 17 June 2015.

Teams will play each other twice, both at home and away, in the group stage, that will begin on weekend of 12/13/14/15 November 2015, and continued through to 21/22/23/24 January 2016, before the pool winners and three best runners-up progressed to the quarter finals.

Teams will be awarded competition points, based on match result. Teams receive 4 points for a win, 2 points for a draw, 1 attacking bonus point for scoring four or more tries in a match and 1 defensive bonus point for losing a match by seven points or fewer.

In the event of a tie between two or more teams, the following tie-breakers will be used, as directed by EPCR:
 Where teams have played each other
 The club with the greater number of competition points from only matches involving tied teams.
 If equal, the club with the best aggregate points difference from those matches.
 If equal, the club that scored the most tries in those matches.
 Where teams remain tied and/or have not played each other in the competition (i.e. are from different pools)
 The club with the best aggregate points difference from the pool stage.
 If equal, the club that scored the most tries in the pool stage.
 If equal, the club with the fewest players suspended in the pool stage.
 If equal, the drawing of lots will determine a club's ranking..

Pool 1

Pool 2

Pool 3

Pool 4

Pool 5

Pool winners and runners-up rankings

Knock-out stage

The eight qualifiers will be ranked according to performance in the pool stages, and competed in the quarter-finals, which will be held on the weekend of 8/9/10 April 2016. The four top seeds will host the quarter-finals against the lower seeds, in a 1v8, 2v7, 3v6 and 4v5 format.

The semi-finals will played on the weekend of 22/23/24 April 2016. In lieu of the draw that used to determine the semi-final pairing, EPCR announced that a fixed semi-final bracket would be set in advance, and that home advantage would be awarded to a side based on "performances by clubs during the pool stages as well as the achievement of a winning a quarter-final match away from home".

Home advantage, will be awarded as follows:

The winners of the semi-finals will contest the final, at Parc Olympique Lyonnais (called "Grand Stade de Lyon" by EPCR), on 13 May 2016.

Bracket

Quarter-finals

Semi-finals

Final

Attendances
Does not include final as this is held at a neutral venue.

See also
2015–16 European Rugby Champions Cup

Notes

References

 
2015-16